Christophe Masson (born 6 September 1985) is a French road bicycle racer, who currently rides for Luxembourg amateur team VC Diekirch. He competed in the 2017 Liège–Bastogne–Liège, finishing in 124th place.

Major results

2007
 6th Overall Tour de Taiwan
2015
 7th Paris–Mantes-en-Yvelines
2016
 6th UAE Cup
 7th Paris–Mantes-en-Yvelines

References

External links

1985 births
Living people
French male cyclists